Grupo Desportivo de Joane (abbreviated as GD Joane) is a Portuguese football club based in Joane, Vila Nova de Famalicão in the district of Braga.

Background
GD Joane currently plays in the Terceira Divisão Série A which is the fourth tier of Portuguese football.   The club was founded in 1930 and they play their home matches at the Estádio de Barreiros in Joane, Vila Nova de Famalicão.

The club is affiliated to Associação de Futebol de Braga and has competed in the AF Braga Taça.  The club has also entered the national cup competition known as Taça de Portugal on many occasions.

Season to season

Honours
Terceira Divisão: 2011–12 (Série A)

Footnotes

External links
Official website 

Football clubs in Portugal
Association football clubs established in 1930
1930 establishments in Portugal